William Holmes Dickie (30 May 1929 – 9 January 2012) was the President of the Scottish Football Association from season 1993–94 to 1996–97.

Dickie also served as a director for Motherwell FC for over 30 years, including a spell as club chairman between 2003 and 2008.

Architect work

Bill Dickie was also an architect, who was responsible in the early 1990s for the redesign of the North(Davie Cooper Stand) and South Stands at Motherwell FC's Fir Park stadium.

References

1929 births
2012 deaths
Scottish architects
Chairmen and investors of football clubs in Scotland
Motherwell F.C.
Motherwell F.C. non-playing staff
20th-century Scottish businesspeople